Germany was present at the Eurovision Song Contest 1975, held in Stockholm, Sweden.

The German national final to select their entry, Vorentscheid 1975: Ein Lied für Stockholm, was held on 3 February at the Hessischer Rundfunk Studio 1 in Frankfurt am Main, and was hosted by journalist Karin Tietze-Ludwig, already well known for hosting the international preview "Auftakt für Brighton" a year before.

Fifteen songs made it to the national final, which was broadcast by Hessischer Rundfunk to ARD broadcasters across West Germany. The winner was decided by nine regional juries with four members each. Each jury member would assign points 1 to 5 for their five favorite songs. The highest score a song could receive (with every jury member from every region voting 5 on one song) was 180.

The winning entry was "Ein Lied kann eine Brücke sein", performed by Joy Fleming and composed by Reiner Pietsch with lyrics by Michael Holm. Other notable competitors included 1971 Contest winner Séverine, two-time German representative Katja Ebstein, past German representative Mary Roos, and Peggy March, well known in Germany and briefly in the U.S. for the song "I Will Follow Him".

Before Eurovision

Ein Lied für Stockholm

At Eurovision
Joy Fleming performed fourth on the night of the contest, following France and preceding Luxembourg. At the close of the voting the song had received 15 points, placing 17th in a field of 19 competing countries. It was the lowest ranking Germany had seen in the competition to this point, and would continue to hold the distinction of having the lowest ranking out of all the German Eurovision songs until 1991, when the German entry that year placed 18th.

Voting

References

External links
German National Final 1975

1975
Countries in the Eurovision Song Contest 1975
Eurovision